Temnosceloides carnusi is a species of beetle in the family Cerambycidae. It was described by Meunier, Jérôme Sudre and Pierre Téocchi in 2009. It is known from Nigeria.

References

Stenobiini
Beetles described in 2009